A Song for Ella Grey is a 2014 young adult novel, written by David Almond and illustrated by Karen Radford. It is based on the legend, Orpheus and Eurydice.

Reception
Publishers Weekly, in a starred review of A Song for Ella Grey, wrote "Like Orpheus’s music, Almond’s lyrical narrative will sweep readers on a journey to unearthly, mysterious realms and back. Mythological characters come to life while remaining enigmatic enough to set imaginations spinning." and Kirkus Reviews wrote "Almond brings his hypnotic lyricism to this darkly romantic tale that sings of the madness of youth, the ache of love, and the near-impossibility of grasping death." The Guardian called it "a beautiful book that works on several levels."

A Song for Ella Grey has also been reviewed by Booklist, Voice of Youth Advocates magazine, The Horn Book Magazine, School Library Connection, The School Library Journal, The Bulletin of the Center for Children's Books, and The Daily Telegraph.

Awards
2015 The Bookseller YA Book Prize - shortlist
2015 Guardian Children's Fiction Prize - winner
2015 IBW Children's Book Award - shortlist
2015 Peters' Book of the Year Teen Fiction - winner
2016 UKLA Book Award - longlist
2016 Carnegie Medal - nominated
2016 YALSA Best Fiction for Young Adults

References

2014 British novels
British young adult novels
Works based on legends
Orpheus
Hodder & Stoughton books